Like..? is the debut extended play (EP) by American rapper Ice Spice. It was released on January 20, 2023 through 10K Projects and Capitol Records, and was announced only hours prior to its release. The EP was preceded by the singles; "Munch (Feelin' U)", "Bikini Bottom", and "In Ha Mood". Frequent collaborator RiotUSA served as the executive producer for the EP. The song "Gangsta Boo", featuring Lil Tjay, debuted at 82 on the Billboard Hot 100 and was Ice Spice's first song to appear on the chart.

Track listing

Notes 
 "Gangsta Boo" samples "I Need a Girl (Part Two)" (2002), written by Sean Combs, Adonis Shopshire, Chauncey Lamont Hawkins, Frank Romano, Mario Winans, Michael Carlos Jones, as performed by Diddy.

Charts

References 

2023 debut EPs
Ice Spice EPs
Capitol Records EPs